Magdalena Antonelli Moreno (9 May 1877 – 1955) was a Uruguayan politician. She was one of the first group of women elected to General Assembly, serving in the Chamber of Representatives from 1943 to 1947.

Biography
Antonelli was born in San Carlos in 1877. She became head of the Women's Committee for Peace through Democracy of Uruguay.

In the 1942 general elections she was placed eleventh on the Colorado Party list for Montevideo, and was elected to the Chamber of Representatives as the party won 13 seats, becoming one of the first group of four women in Congress. In 1946 her proposed amendments to the Civil Code to introduce gender equality were approved by Congress. She lost her seat in the 1946 elections, but subsequently served as an substitute member on several occasions.

References

1877 births
People from San Carlos, Uruguay
20th-century Uruguayan women politicians
20th-century Uruguayan politicians
Members of the Chamber of Representatives of Uruguay
Colorado Party (Uruguay) politicians
1955 deaths